Lepoglava is a town in Varaždin County, northern Croatia, located southwest of Varaždin, west of Ivanec, and northeast of Krapina.

Demographics
A total of 8,283 residents in the municipality (2011 census) live in the following settlements:

 Bednjica, population 209
 Crkovec, population 188
 Donja Višnjica, population 542
 Gornja Višnjica, population 271
 Jazbina Višnjička, population 25
 Kamenica, population 141
 Kamenički Vrhovec, population 205
 Kameničko Podgorje, population 322
 Lepoglava, population 4,174
 Muričevec, population 195
 Očura, population 188
 Viletinec, population 173
 Vulišinec, population 237
 Zalužje, population 162
 Zlogonje, population 412
 Žarovnica, population 839

History
Lepoglava is probably best known for hosting the main Croatian prison, the Lepoglava prison.  In 1854, a monastery of the Pauline Fathers was transformed by the authorities into a prison.  In the twentieth century, the prison was used to intern political prisoners by the authorities of Kingdom of Yugoslavia, the Independent State of Croatia, and SFR Yugoslavia.

During WWII, the Lepoglava concentration camp is built by the Ustashe, around 2,000 prisoners were murdered there.

References

Further reading

External links

 

Cities and towns in Croatia
Populated places in Varaždin County